Guncrazy is a 1992 American crime drama film inspired by the 1950 film Gun Crazy. It was directed by Tamra Davis in her feature film directorial debut, written by Matthew Bright and starring Drew Barrymore. Davis had read the script in 1985, but filming did not begin until November 1991. The film was shown at the Cannes Film Festival on May 14, 1992, and aired on Showtime beginning later that year. The film had a limited theatrical release in January 1993.

Plot

A teenager murders her stepfather, a sexually abusive man, after he teaches her how to use a gun. Through a misapplied school pen-pal assignment, she meets a prisoner, Howard, whom she seduces back into the world of guns. She marries Howard and decides to show him the remains of her stepfather; Howard helps her dispose of the body. After they dispose of the corpse, Howard commits several homicides, although he was provoked in every instance.

Cast
 Drew Barrymore as Anita Minteer
 Michael Ironside as Mr. Kincaid, Joy's Father
 James LeGros as Howard Hickok
 Billy Drago as Hank Fulton
 Robert Greenberg as Mr. Sheets
 Rodney Harvey as Tom
 Jeremy Davies as Bill
 Dan Eisenstein as Chuck
 Joe Dallesandro as Rooney
 Ione Skye as Joy Kincaid
 James Oseland as Sally
 Lawrence Steven Meyers as Larry "Crazy Larry"
 Herb Weld as Clyde
 Lee Mary Weilnau as Susan
 Dick Warlock as Sheriff
 Michael Franco as Officer Frank
 Tracey Walter as Elton
 Roger Jackson as Joe
 Zane W. Levitt as Ed Hopper
 Damon Jones as Damian
 Harrison Young as Mr. Hickok, Howard's Father
 Leo Lee as "Soda Pop", Pimp
 Rowena Guinness as Ruby, The Prostitute
 Jaid Barrymore as Woman With Dog
 Diamond The Dog as Schlitzy The Dog

Production
Guncrazy was Tamra Davis' directorial debut, and was written by Matthew Bright. The film was inspired by the 1950 film Gun Crazy, but is not a remake. Davis originally read the script in 1985 and "loved it because it was one of the few scripts I'd come across that revolved around a strong female character. I then spent years trying to set the picture up and hearing people say, 'Why do you want to make a film about two awful kids who go around killing people?' But that wasn't the picture I saw." According to the Los Angeles Times, Davis was interested in the script because of "the complex psychology of the female lead character, the lower-middle-class milieu where the tale unfolds, and how the story romanticizes the gun." Davis said, "I'd never held a gun before making this movie, I don't own one now and the last thing I want to do is romanticize guns. I wanted to show that America is obsessed with guns, and that if you have them around, bad things can happen because it only takes a second to pull the trigger."

Barrymore repeatedly called to plead that she play the role of Anita. Davis later said, "I saw her and knew she was perfect. You could see she's been through a lot, and the world has not been easy to her. And yet she has this incredible vulnerability. She's so determined to prove that she's worthy of the Barrymore name." Barrymore said, "Anita was very close to home for me. Not that I was so much like her. I'm not. But I had the best understanding of her than any character I've ever played in my life." Barrymore declined to have a chauffeur drive her to the filming locations, which is commonly done for actors. According to Davis: "She said, 'No, you're not going to treat me like a baby.' She said, 'I can get to work on time on my own.'"

Merrie Lawson, the film's costume designer, observed girls at Pasadena's Eagle Rock Plaza shopping mall to determine how Barrymore's character should dress: "We were looking for a real-life gutter image. We didn't want it to look like Hollywood. We wanted a little girl, living without a mother, who only can buy clothes every few years. I got everything from the Salvation Army, St. Vincent de Paul's and Goodwill shops." According to Lawson, undersized dresses were chosen for Barrymore "as if they were years old and all of a sudden she grew a bust." Lawson also tie-dyed all of Barrymore's clothing, including the socks, "to give the image of someone who doesn't do laundry very often, and does it all together."

Filming began on November 10, 1991, in Los Angeles, California, where a majority of filming occurred. Filming in Los Angeles concluded after 23 days. Guncrazy'''s opening shots were filmed in Ely, Nevada. The film was created at a cost of either $800,000 or $900,000.

Release
The film premiered at the Cannes Film Festival on May 14, 1992. The film did not attract much interest from theater exhibitors at the festival, and its distribution rights went to Showtime and Academy Entertainment, which had the highest bids, covering the cost of making the film. In September 1992, the film was shown at the Toronto International Film Festival, where it was noticed by Los Angeles film consultant Ray Price. The film's producers were asked by Price if he could organize a theatrical release, despite the film being categorized as a television movie and being planned for video release.

The film began airing on Showtime in October 1992, and aired five times during that fall. Price recalled, "I found myself saying to theater people: 'I have this film which has been on television and is coming out on video. Would you like to play it?'" The film was shown at Los Angeles' Landmark Nuart theater in January 1993, and successfully earned $9,211 after five showings. Later that month, on January 27, 1993, the film premiered at Manhattan's Film Forum theater for a scheduled two-week period. In its second weekend at Film Forum, the film's revenue decreased 34 percent as a result of only being shown on one screen instead of two; however, the film still earned a successful $10,302. In its fourth weekend at Film Forum, revenue decreased 30 percent, earning the film $5,191. In its sixth weekend at Film Forum, the film earned $3,971, up 19 percent from the previous weekend.

As of February 1993, the film was also being shown in Dallas, Cleveland, and Seattle, after it earned positive reviews from showings in New York and Los Angeles. Academy Entertainment released the film on VHS on February 24, 1993, while it was still being shown in theaters. At that time, the film had grossed $125,000 from theatrical showings. The New York Times noted that it was unusual for films to be shown in theaters after they have been broadcast on television and released on video.

Reception
On website Rotten Tomatoes, the film has a rating of 63% based on reviews from 8 critics.

Todd McCarthy of Variety wrote that the film is "competently made" but "lacks the exhilaration of a first-class lovers-on-the-run crime drama". Kenneth Turan of the Los Angeles Times wrote a positive review and stated, "Made with sureness and authority, this film doesn't condescend to either its characters or their relationship, and that counts for a lot." Turan wrote that although the film "is very efficiently made (and stylishly photographed by Lisa Rinzler, one of a very few women cinematographers) it does occasionally overreach, going a little heavy on the rural grotesques as well as the romantic nature of the Anita/Howard relationship. On the other hand, it is the film's ability to mostly show us that relationship on its own terms, to reveal both why these two are made for each other and why their very closeness inevitably leads to disaster, that is its strongest suit. With moments of odd, dark humor sprinkled among the violence, this traditional study of psycho kittens in love breaks just enough new ground to be an impressive piece of work."

Peter Travers of Rolling Stone called Guncrazy a "knock-out B movie". Vincent Canby of The New York Times called the film "very accomplished and "cruelly entertaining", and praised the "excellent screenplay". Canby called the film "a remarkably rich melodrama with a strong narrative line and vivid characters. There's no waste space in this movie. Every second of its 97 minutes counts." Hal Hinson of The Washington Post called the film a "source of constant surprise," and wrote that Bright's screenplay "gives the movie a strong sense of direction even when his characters are lost. Plus, Bright gives the actors some classic deadpan lines." Marc Savlov of The Austin Chronicle gave the film three and a half stars out of five and wrote, "Barrymore proves -- once again -- that she's better than 98% of the teenage actresses out there; she manages to make Anita simultaneously pathetic in her desperate neediness and powerful in her smoldering, turbo-charged teenage sexuality."TV Guide gave the film three stars out of five and wrote, "Marketing-minded folks may be quick to position Guncrazy as a 90s take on Bonnie and Clyde (1967), and its title is certainly meant to evoke Joseph H. Lewis's 1949 classic Gun Crazy. But this film is by no means as brash, startling, or iconoclastic as either." TV Guide'' also wrote, "Despite her character's actions and circumstances, Barrymore brilliantly makes the audience believe Anita is not a slutty piece of trailer trash with her guileless, winning smile and chirpy good-heartedness." Fred Beldin of AllMovie gave the film two and a half stars out of five and called it an "effective low-key thriller". Beldin praised Barrymore's performance and called Drago's character "unforgettable", stating that he played the role "with just the right combination of huckster con artist and hardcore Holy Roller."

Awards
Barrymore was nominated for Best Actress in a Miniseries or Television Film at the 50th Golden Globe Awards.

References

External links
 
 

1992 films
1992 crime drama films
American crime drama films
Films directed by Tamra Davis
Films shot in Los Angeles
Films shot in Nevada
Films with screenplays by Matthew Bright
1992 directorial debut films
1990s English-language films
1990s American films